Sir Samuel Romilly (1 March 1757 – 2 November 1818), was a British lawyer, politician and legal reformer. From a background in the commercial world, he became well-connected, and rose to public office and a prominent position in Parliament. After an early interest in radical politics, he built a career in chancery cases, and then turned to amelioration of the British criminal law.

Early life
Romilly was born in Frith Street, Soho, London, the second son of Peter Romilly, a watchmaker and jeweller, and his wife Margaret Garnault, daughter of Aimé Garnault, another jeweller. He was largely self-educated. Romilly had Sir Samuel Fludyer, 1st Baronet as godfather and first cousin once removed, and prospects for entering his business; but Sir Samuel died in 1768, followed by his brother Sir Thomas in 1769, and the opportunity fell away
. He served for a time in his father's shop. He became a good classical scholar, and was conversant with French literature.

The family was Huguenot, and spoke French at home. They attended the French Protestant Chapel in Soho, where John (Jean) Roget from Geneva was pastor. Roget introduced Romilly to the works of Jean Jacques Rousseau, and he became a follower.

Romilly was articled in 1773 to William Michael Lally, a chancery solicitor. Lally worked in the Six Clerks office of the Court of Chancery. Romilly after five years turned down the possibility of purchasing his post there.

Legal career
In 1778 Romilly decided on a career as barrister, and entered Gray's Inn. He was a pupil of Jeffries Spranger, an equity draughtsman. Called to the bar in 1783, he went the Midland circuit, but was mostly occupied with chancery practice. His practice at the chancery bar grew, and in 1800 he was made a King's Counsel. In 1805 he was appointed chancellor of the county palatine of Durham.

Travels and associations, radical period

First continental tour
In the legal vacation of 1781, Romilly made a tour in France and Switzerland. He had the family connection with Geneva, through John Roget, now his brother-in-law. Roget, who died in 1783, moved back there for his health, and Romilly brought out the young Peter Mark Roget to be reunited with his parents. In Geneva Romilly also met Pierre Étienne Louis Dumont. Staying for a period with David Chauvet, one of the progressive group of local politicians, Romilly met also the like-minded Etienne Clavière, Jacques-Antoine Douveray and Etienne Reybaz.

A friend from the Paris leg of this visit was Marguerite Madeleine Delessert (1767–1839), later Madame Gautier. She had had Rousseau as a family friend, her mother being Madeleine Catherine Boy de La Tour who married Etienne Delessert (1735–1816). She became the wife of the Genevan banker Jean-Antoine Gautier (1756–1800), who moved to Paris. Romilly stayed at the Delessert home in Passy.

Second continental tour
In 1783, immediately after being called to the bar, Romilly made a second tour. This time he was accompanied in France by John Baynes, and met Benjamin Franklin at Passy, to whom Baynes had an introduction from John Jebb. In Lausanne he met the Abbé Raynal.

In the meantime, the failed Geneva Revolution of 1782 had occurred. Romilly was introduced in 1784 to Honoré Mirabeau, by the Genevan writer François d'Ivernois, as his Memoirs state; Halevy says it was through Thomas Brand Hollis. D'Ivernois and Dumont formed part of the group of the revolution's leaders who by then were exiles in London. Mirabeau saw him daily for a long time.

Bowood circle
The Marquess of Lansdowne, to 1784 William Petty, 2nd Earl of Shelburne and Prime Minister in 1782–3, invited Romilly to Bowood House, around 1784–5. He had heard Romilly's name from Mirabeau, had read the pamphlet A Fragment on the Constitutional Power and Duty of Juries upon Trials for Libels by Romilly, and was interested in Dumont.

In what has been called the Bowood circle, Jeremy Bentham, with whom Romilly was acquainted, became a friend, and he had much to do with Benjamin Vaughan, another friend.

French Revolution and its era
In 1789 Romilly visited Paris, and studied the course of the French Revolution there, also visiting the dungeon at Vincennes where Mirabeau had been confined. When Mirabeau became a political leader, it was to Romilly that he applied for an account of the procedure used in the House of Commons of Great Britain. He left France with less optimism about the politics of the Revolution.

Romilly's abilities were recognized by the Whig party. In July 1793 he defended Birmingham booksellers who had sold Tom Paine's works, despite thinking Paine was lacking in arguments; and in August of that year attended the sedition trial of Thomas Muir, which he regarded as shocking.

By the end of 1793 Romilly had concluded that French revolutionary politics amounted to "barbarism". He explained in 1794 to his correspondent Madame Gautier that "public events" had brought about his change of views. In August 1797 he secured the acquittal of the radical John Binns.

During the Peace of Amiens, Romilly was in Paris. He visited the Palais Bourbon, where the Legislative Assembly met, with Bentham.

Political career
In 1806, on the accession of the Ministry of All the Talents to office, Romilly was offered the post of Solicitor General, although he had never sat in the House of Commons. He accepted, was knighted, and was brought into parliament for Queenborough. He went out of office with the government, but remained in the House of Commons, sitting successively for Horsham, Wareham and Arundel. Romilly's reforming efforts made his reputation. In 1818, he was returned at the head of the poll for the city of Westminster. He had not much longer to live.

Abolitionist
Romilly was a vocal opponent of the slave trade. His interest came early in life, by the time of his meeting in 1783 with the Abbé Raynal, whose Histoire des deux Indes he had read. He gave his support to William Wilberforce's abolition campaign.

During the parliamentary debate on the Slave Trade Bill, Romilly paid tribute to Wilberforce, saying that his leadership had "preserved so many millions of his fellow creatures." As he concluded his remarks, Romilly was greeted with a standing ovation by other Members of Parliament, a reaction that very rarely occurred in the House of Commons. Wilberforce himself sat with his head in his hands, tears streaming down his face.

Legal reformer
Romilly worked to reform the criminal law, under the influence of what is now called Classical criminology. He spent a dozen years of his life on the passage through Parliament of legislative reforms. He argued against the attitudes to punishments of Martin Madan and William Paley. The so-called Bloody Code of justice was, in his view, something that required reform, while, as he stated in his Memoirs, one effect of the French Revolution was to lessen the chances of Parliament passing the necessary legislation. The tide of opinion, however, was beginning to turn.

In 1808, Romilly managed to repeal the Elizabethan statute which made it a capital offence to steal from the person. Successful prosecutions of pickpockets then rose. Charles Williams-Wynn, on the other hand, saw Romilly's background in equity law, and discrete bills, as inadequate.

In 1809, three bills for repealing draconian statutes were thrown out by the House of Lords under the influence of Lord Ellenborough. Romilly saw further bills rejected; but in March 1812 he had repealed a statute of Elizabeth I making it a capital offence for a soldier or a mariner to beg without a pass from a magistrate or his commanding officer.

In 1813 John William Ward found the approach too "philosophical". Romilly failed to pass a law which would have abolished corruption of blood for all crimes, but in the following year he tried again and succeeded (except for treason and murder). Also in 1814 he succeeded in abolishing hanging, drawing and quartering.

Seeing a connection, Romilly also advocated prison reform in 1811. Here, however, reform in the direction proposed by Jeremy Bentham was thwarted.

Works
A Fragment on the Constitutional Power and Duty of Juries upon Trials for Libels (1784) on juries and the Case of the Dean of St Asaph, anonymous publication by the Society for Constitutional Information.
Observations on a Late Publication Intituled, Thoughts on Executive Justice (1786), influenced by Cesare Beccaria, was a reply to Martin Madan's Thoughts on Executive Justice, advocating the increase of capital punishments.
Thoughts on the Probable Influence of the Late Revolution in France upon Great Britain (1790).
Letters containing an Account of the late Revolution in France, and Observations on the Laws, Manners, and Institutions of the English; written during the author's residence at Paris and Versailles in the years 1789 and 1790; translated from the German of Henry Frederic Groenvelt (1792), translation from the French of letters of Etienne Dumont, with some of Romilly's own letters (assistance from James Scarlett), containing criticism of British politics from a republican angle.

Death
On 29 October 1818 Lady Romilly died in the Isle of Wight. A few days later, on 2 November 1818, Romilly cut his throat, and died in a few minutes, in his house on Russell Square in London. His nephew Peter Mark Roget attended him in his final moments. His last words were written: My dear, I wish ... presumably regarding his late wife. 

Romilly was buried on 11 November 1818 at the parish church of St Michael and All Angels, Knill, Herefordshire, with his wife Ann.

Family
Romilly married Anne Garbett, daughter of Francis Garbett, of Knill Court, Herefordshire, in 1798. They had met at Bowood House, and Francis Garbett had worked for Lord Shelburne as his secretary. They had six sons and a daughter:

 Sophia Romilly (d. 9 Oct 1879). She married the Rt. Hon. Thomas Francis Kennedy, Member of Parliament for Ayr Burghs and grandson of John Adam.
 William Romilly (1798 - 3 Oct 1855)
 John Romilly, 1st Baron Romilly (10 Jan 1802 - 23 Dec 1874).
 Edward Romilly (1804 - 12 Oct 1870). He married Sophia Marcet, daughter of Swiss chemist Alexander John Gaspard Marcet. They had no known children.
 Henry Romilly (31 Dec 1804 - 25 Dec 1884). He married Rosa Morris, and had no known issue.
 Charles Romilly (1808 - 29 Aug 1887). He married Lady Georgiana Elizabeth Russell, daughter of John Russell, 6th Duke of Bedford and Georgiana Gordon. They had six sons.
 Lt.-Col. Frederick Romilly (21 Mar 1810 - 6 Apr 1887).

References

Further reading
The Speeches of Sir Samuel Romilly in the House of Commons (2 vols., 1820)
Patrick Medd, Romilly: A Life of Sir Samuel Romilly. Lawyer and Reformer (Collins, 1968)

External links 

 Chambers' Book of Days
 
 

Attribution

English barristers
Members of the Parliament of the United Kingdom for English constituencies
People from Soho
British politicians who committed suicide
British anti–death penalty activists
Suicides by sharp instrument in England
1757 births
1818 deaths
UK MPs 1806–1807
UK MPs 1807–1812
UK MPs 1812–1818
Solicitors General for England and Wales
Members of Gray's Inn
British reformers
Knights Bachelor
English King's Counsel
1810s suicides